Martin Christensen (born 23 December 1987) is a Danish former professional footballer. He played 28 games and scored three goals for various Danish national youth teams from 2005 to 2008.

Career
Christensen started his senior career with Herfølge Boldklub. He signed for English club Charlton Athletic from in June 2007 for an initial £250,000, which could potentially rise to £350,000. He made his first Charlton appearance in a friendly match against Welling United. He joined Dutch team Heracles Almelo on a loan deal in January 2008. In January 2009, he was loaned out to Danish club Lyngby BK until the end of the season. On 20 August 2009, he joined Italian Prima Divisione club Rimini Calcio on a permanent deal, without making a single first team appearance for Charlton. He signed a 1+1 contract. In February 2010, Christensen signed a three-year contract with Haugesund FK in the Norwegian Premier League.

He had a brief spell at SønderjyskE in spring 2011, but moved to HB Køge in April 2011.

Christensen returned to HB Køge in the summer 2018. At the end of the season, he retired and continued at Køge as a youth coach.

Footnotes

External links
 Danish national team profile
 Martin Christensen at Soccerway

1987 births
Living people
Danish men's footballers
Denmark under-21 international footballers
Denmark youth international footballers
Herfølge Boldklub players
Charlton Athletic F.C. players
Heracles Almelo players
Eredivisie players
Danish expatriate men's footballers
Expatriate footballers in the Netherlands
Danish expatriate sportspeople in the Netherlands
Expatriate footballers in England
Expatriate footballers in Norway
Lyngby Boldklub players
Rimini F.C. 1912 players
FK Haugesund players
SønderjyskE Fodbold players
HB Køge players
Åtvidabergs FF players
Helsingborgs IF players
Eliteserien players
Danish Superliga players
Allsvenskan players
Association football midfielders
People from Ishøj Municipality
Danish expatriate sportspeople in Italy
Danish expatriate sportspeople in Sweden
Sportspeople from the Capital Region of Denmark